Mikadotrochus is a genus of sea snails, marine gastropod mollusks in the family Pleurotomariidae, the slit snails.

Species
Species within the genus Mikadotrochus include:
 Mikadotrochus beyrichii (Hilgendorf, 1877)
 Mikadotrochus gotoi (Anseeuw, 1990)
 Mikadotrochus hirasei hirasei (Pilsbry, 1903)
 Mikadotrochus hirasei yamamotoi (A. Yamamoto, 1993), Species inquirenda
 Mikadotrochus mikadotrochus Pilsbry
 Mikadotrochus salmianus (Rolle, 1887)
 Mikadotrochus nantoensisLin，1975:
Species brought into synonymy 
 Mikadotrochus amabilis Bayer, 1963: synonym of Perotrochus amabilis (Bayer, 1963)
 Mikadotrochus anseeuwi Kanazawa & Y. Goto, 1991: synonym of Perotrochus anseeuwi Kanazawa & Y. Goto, 1991
 Mikadotrochus caledonicus (Bouchet & Métivier, 1982): synonym of Perotrochus caledonicus Bouchet & Métivier, 1982
 Mikadotrochus deforgesi B. Métivier, 1990: synonym of Perotrochus deforgesi Métivier, 1990 
 Mikadotrochus oishii T. Shikama, 1973: synonym of Perotrochus oishii (Shikama, 1973)
 Mikadotrochus schmalzi T. Shikama, 1961: synonym of Mikadotrochus salmianus (Rolle, 1899)

References

Further reading 
 Lindholm, W. A. (1927). On Pleurotomaria beyrichi Hilgendorf (Gastropoda) in the collection of Zoological Museum of the Academy of Science, with a note about the genus Pleurotomaria s. lat. Doklady Akademii nauk SSSR. 24: 409–414.
 Williams, S.T., Karube, S. & Ozawa, T. (2008) Molecular systematics of Vetigastropoda: Trochidae, Turbinidae and Trochoidea redefined. Zoologica Scripta 37, 483–506

Pleurotomariidae
Gastropod genera
Taxa named by Wassili Adolfovitch Lindholm